Ardsley may refer to:
Ardsley, New York, United States
Ardsley, Pennsylvania, United States
Ardsley, South Yorkshire, England
East Ardsley, West Yorkshire, England
Ardsley railway station, a former station at East Ardsley 
West Ardsley, West Yorkshire, England
Ardsley (SEPTA station), a commuter rail station in Ardsley, Pennsylvania.
 Ardsley (automobile)